Caledia is a genus of silent slant-faced grasshoppers in the family Acrididae. There is at least one described species in Caledia, C. captiva, found in Australia.

References

External links

 

Acrididae